Tropizodium is a genus of spiders in the family Zodariidae. It was first described in 2005 by Jocqué & Churchill.

Species
, it contains 11 species:
Tropizodium bengalense (Tikader & Patel, 1975) – India
Tropizodium kalami Prajapati, Murthappa, Sankaran & Sebastian, 2016 – India
Tropizodium kovvurense (Reddy & Patel, 1993) – India
Tropizodium molokai Jocqué & Churchill, 2005 – Hawaii
Tropizodium murphyorum Dankittipakul, Jocqué & Singtripop, 2012 – Bali
Tropizodium peregrinum Jocqué & Churchill, 2005 – Australia (Northern Territory). Introduced to Reunion
Tropizodium poonaense (Tikader, 1981) – India
Tropizodium serraferum (Lin & Li, 2009) – China
Tropizodium siam Dankittipakul, Jocqué & Singtripop, 2012 – Thailand
Tropizodium trispinosum (Suman, 1967) – Hawaii, French Polynesia (Society Is., Tuamotu)
Tropizodium viridurbium Prajapati, Murthappa, Sankaran & Sebastian, 2016 – India

References

Zodariidae
Araneomorphae genera
Spiders of Asia
Spiders of Oceania